Tropical Hut is a Filipino chain of fast food restaurants owned by Mercury Group of Companies, Inc. It is the 7th oldest food chain in the Philippines and is considered by some Filipinos as the "original" burger joint in the Philippines, being older than Jollibee (1978) and McDonald's Philippines (1981).

History 
Established in 1962, Tropical Hut started as a sari-sari store that expanded into an ordinary grocery store and later rapidly into a supermarket with a coffee shop. Through its success within these years, the name Tropical Hut Hamburger was introduced with the company being incorporated as Tropical Hut Food Market, Inc. on February 26, 1965.

In 1972, the Mercury Group of Companies acquired the said company and expanded its branches in building several branches across Metro Manila.

Decline and resurgence 

Over the years, Tropical Hut had been overshadowed by other fast food chains like Jollibee and suffered a decline.

On June 12, 2022, a Twitter thread by stock analyst John Paul Tanyag (@dumidyeypee) lamented how he was the only customer in their Escolta branch, and expressed nostalgia about the restaurant's former glory. Around the same time, another social media post from 2019 from a branch in Carmona, Cavite (which had since closed) that said "Kumain naman kayo sa amin" (Come on, please eat with us) became viral.

These and other social media posts triggered a domino effect and resurgence of interest in the fast-food chain, prompting Filipinos to visit nearby branches to check the restaurant for themselves. Riding on a wave of nostalgia after going viral on social media, branches started to sell out, with some even having to turn away customers due to inability to keep up with demand. This led to Tropical Hut creating more staff openings as well as clamor to open provincial branches to serve more people.

Branch locations 
As of July 2022, Tropical Hut operates 21 stores across the island of Luzon, 17 of which are in Metro Manila. The fast food chain also operates six stores with 24/7 service.

In Philippine literature 
Tropical Hut and its hamburgers have been mentioned in the following books, essays and stories.

 The Tropical Hut Food Mart grocery store and the Tropical Hut Hamburger fast food chain are mentioned as part of a town setting in Prospero Reyes Covar's 1998 essay Larangan: Seminal Essays of Philippine Culture, mentioning the fast food chain's Rancho Ranchero and Hawaiian Glee burgers and clubhouse sandwiches as part of the menu at the time. 
 In Layeta Bucoy's short story Tres Amores, Charisma asks a roving male guard at a Robinsons mall if there is a Tropical Hut branch at the mall.
 One of the ten stories covered in Geraldine Maayo's A Quality of Sadness, mentions Tropical Hut's former branch along Session Road in Baguio as a go-to for hamburger lunches and as a stopover for frequent travelers.
 In Wala Lang by Bud Tomas, the author reminisces Tropical Hut as the only burger joint in his hometown.
 In Federico Acuña Espiritu's Tempest: Eye in the Storm, the author mentions that a printing press owner would order hamburgers from a Tropical Hut across a National Book Store branch, which the author regarded as "the best hamburger at that time".

References 

1962 establishments in the Philippines
Fast-food chains of the Philippines
Fast-food hamburger restaurants
Philippine brands
Restaurants established in 1962